Locke Lord LLP is an international law firm formed on October 2, 2007, after the combination of Texas-based Locke Liddell & Sapp PLLC and Lord Bissell & Brook LLP. Locke Lord's earliest predecessor firms date from 1887 and 1891. The firm is headquartered in Dallas, Texas and changed its name to Locke Lord LLP on September 27, 2011.

History
Locke Lord's origin traces back to 1914, when John Lord started its predecessor in Chicago.

In 1999, Locke Liddell & Sapp was formed from the merger of two predecessor firms in Dallas and Houston. In May 2007, the management of both Locke Liddell & Sapp and Lord Bissell & Brook proposed a corporate merger. On September 12, 2007, the partnership of each firm approved the merger, effective October 2, 2007.

On January 10, 2015, the merger between Locke Lord and Edwards Wildman Palmer was completed. The merged firm adopted the name Locke Lord, although legacy offices of Edwards Wildman Palmer used the name Locke Lord Edwards for a transition period. The firm employs 641 attorneys.

Practice groups
Locke Lord's practice groups include:

Affordable Housing
Antitrust
Bankruptcy, Restructuring & Insolvency
Construction
Corporate & Transactional
 Employee Benefits & Executive Compensation
 Environmental
 Environmental, Social, and Governance (ESG)
 Governmental
 Intellectual Property
 Labor & Employment
 Litigation
 Privacy & Cybersecurity
 Private Equity
 Public Finance
 Real Estate
 Tax

Awards
For its policies and practices related to LGBTQ+ employees, culture and corporate social responsibility, Locke Lord has achieved a 100 percent rating in the Human Rights Campaign (HRC) Foundation’s Corporate Equality Index (CEI) for six consecutive years from 2017 to 2022.

Other notable recognitions include:
 Mansfield Certification Plus 2022
 The Times Best Law Firms 2020
 The Legal 500 UK

Notable clients
Wells Fargo
Deutsche Bank

References

External links
 
 "Miers Led Law Firm Repeatedly Forced to Pay Damages For Defrauding Investors"

Law firms established in 2007
Law firms based in Dallas
Law firms based in Chicago
American companies established in 2007
2007 establishments in Texas